Forgan may refer to:

Places
 Forgan, Saskatchewan, a hamlet in Saskatchewan, Canada
 Forgan, Oklahoma, a town in Beaver County, Oklahoma, United States
 Forgan (Fife), a parish in Fife, Scotland

Other uses
 Forgan (surname)
 Forgan of St. Andrews, a golf club factory